Edward Baron Turk (born September 29, 1946) is a multiple prize-winning American author, arts critic, and educator.  He has held professorial positions at Yale University, the Massachusetts Institute of Technology (MIT), Columbia University (School of the Arts), and the Institut des Etudes Politiques ("Sciences Po," Paris).  He writes mainly on the culture of France – especially its theatre, cinema, and literature – and on Hollywood film. As an author, he has been largely collected by libraries.

Career
In 1973, Yale University appointed Turk as Assistant Professor and Director of Undergraduate Studies in French.  In 1978 he joined the humanities faculty of MIT as an Associate Professor of French and Film Studies, and from 1982 to 1985 he headed MIT's Foreign Languages and Literatures Section (the programs in French, German, Russian, Spanish, and English as a Second Language).  At MIT, where he was promoted to Full Professor in 1990, Turk was a principal architect of the Ivy League-MIT-University of Chicago-Stanford University Consortium on Language and Teaching and of the MIT graduate program in Comparative Media Studies.  In 2005 he was awarded an endowed MIT chair, the John E. Burchard Professorship of the Humanities.

Turk retired from MIT in June 2012.  As part of a public celebration honoring his career in October 2011, he delivered a talk titled "Valedictory Thoughts of an MIT Humanist," in which he described the importance of a deep engagement with the liberal arts in light of the increasingly market-driven turn of pre-professional undergraduate education.  (See http://shass.mit.edu/news/news-2012-edward-turk-valedictory-thoughts-mit-humanist)

Since leaving MIT, Turk has continued with his research and writing, and has been regularly teaching seminars in film studies in the Film Division of Columbia University School of the Arts.

Books
 Baroque Fiction-Making, University of North Carolina Press (1978), .
 Child of Paradise: Marcel Carné and the Golden Age of French Cinema, Harvard University Press (1989), .
 Hollywood Diva: A Biography of Jeanette MacDonald, University of California Press (1998), .
 Marcel Carné et l'âge d'or du cinéma français, L'Harmattan [Paris] (2003), .
 French Theater Today: The View from New York, Paris, and Avignon, University of Iowa Press (2011), .

Other Writings 
Turk's writings on the arts have appeared in such mainstream publications as Architectural Digest, American Film, Film Quarterly, and the San Francisco Chronicle.   His scholarly articles have been published in numerous academic journals, including Philosophy and Rhetoric, Cinema Journal, Literature/Film Quarterly, Camera Obscura, Iris, The French Review,and Modern Language Studies.  For many years he was the Assistant Editor for film at The French Review, the scholarly journal of the American Association of Teachers of French.  From 2006 through 2013, he wrote in-depth chronicles of the Avignon Theatre Festival for each October issue of The French Review.

Honors and Prizes 
1990.  Prize, Theatre Library Association, for the book Child of Paradise 

1993-1998.  President, Xi chapter (Massachusetts Institute of Technology), Phi Beta Kappa Society

1995. Awarded insignia by France's Ministry of Culture as Chevalier de l'Ordre des Arts et des Lettres

1998. Selected, author of "one of the best books of 1998" by the Philadelphia Inquirer for Hollywood Diva 

1999.  Finalist, Kurt Weill Foundation Book Prize, for Hollywood Diva 

2002.  Prize, Le Prix du Syndicat de la Critique du cinéma pour le meilleur livre étranger [French Film Critics Association Prize for best book of the year by a foreign author].

2013. Awarded insignia by France's Ministry of Education as Officier de l'Ordre des Palmes Académiques

References

External links 
 Edward Baron Turk's website at MIT
 shass.mit.edu/news/news-2012-edward-turk-valedictory-thoughts-mit-humanist

Living people
MIT School of Humanities, Arts, and Social Sciences faculty
Columbia University faculty
American male writers
Yale University alumni
Chevaliers of the Ordre des Arts et des Lettres
1946 births
Writers from Brooklyn